An iron ring or ring clamp is an item of laboratory equipment which comprises a conjoined metal ring and radially-extending rod. In some cases, the rod terminates in a screw clamp for attachment to a retort stand or other support; in others, the rod may be attached to a stand by means of a laboratory clamp holder. Iron rings are commonly used in chemistry laboratories for supporting apparatus above the work surface, for example:
 a tapered item such as a filter funnel or separatory funnel.
 a clay triangle, which itself supports an item such as a crucible.
 a wire gauze, which itself supports a flat-bottomed beaker or conical flask.
 a large, and therefore heavy, round-bottom flask.
In some cases, a slot is cut in the side of the ring opposite the rod. This is to allow a funnel to be placed upon and removed from the ring from the side rather than from above, a safer procedure.

References

Laboratory equipment